Men in Hijab is a movement in Iran and other parts of the Persian world in which men wear the hijab, or female headscarf, as a show of solidarity with their female relatives and wives. It seeks to end the requirement of women to wear the hijab outdoors.

See also
 Hijab
 Human rights in Iran

References 

Hijab
Islamic clothing
Protests in Iran
Men and feminism
Islamic male clothing